Lassa is a surname. Notable people with the surname include:

Julie Lassa (born 1970), American politician
Nick Lassa (1898–1964), American football player